IPT may refer to:

Medicine
 Insulin potentiation therapy, an unproven alternative cancer treatment
 Intermittent preventive therapy, a public health intervention
 Interpersonal psychotherapy

Organizations
 Department of Petroleum Engineering and Applied Geophysics, NTNU
 Idaho Public Television
 Illini Prosthetic Technologies, in Illinois
 Indecent Publications Tribunal, a government censorship organisation in New Zealand from 1964 until 1993
 Indian People's Tribunal, a human rights organization
 Inductive Power Transfer, a company which develops wireless power transfer infrastructure
 Industry and Parliament Trust
 International Physicists' Tournament, an EPS association, a physics competition for undergraduate students, began in Ukraine in 2009
 Invercargill Passenger Transport, a bus company in New Zealand
 Investigative Project on Terrorism, founded by Steven Emerson
 Investigatory Powers Tribunal, a UK judicial body which investigates complaints about state surveillance
 IPtronics, a semiconductor company that sells parallel optics for data communication applications
 IVeri Payment Technologies
 , a Brazilian research facility, which created the CAP-1 Planalto aircraft

Technology
 Information Processes and Technology, a NSW Higher School Certificate course in information systems
 IP telephony, or Voice over Internet Protocol
 iPod Touch
 IPT color space, a method of mapping colors in a video system
 iptables, utility program
 MATLAB's standard Image Processing Toolbox
 Inductive power transfer, a form of wireless power transfer
 Inventor Part file, of Autodesk Inventor
 Inverted page table, a type of page table in a computer operating system

Other
 Infant Potty Training, a book by Laurie Boucke
 Insurance Premium Tax (United Kingdom)
 Integrated product team; similarly, integrated process or project team
 International Pool Tour, a former sports tour for pocket billiards
 Iqaluit Public Transit, system operated from July 2003 to January 2005
 Williamsport Regional Airport, by IATA code

See also 
 IPTS (disambiguation)